Sacramento County is a county located in the U.S. state of California. As of the 2020 census, the population was 1,585,055. Its county seat is Sacramento, which has been the state capital of California since 1854.

Sacramento County is the central county of the Greater Sacramento metropolitan area. Sacramento County extends from the low delta lands between the Sacramento River and San Joaquin River, including Suisun Bay, north to about  beyond the State Capitol and east into the foothills of the Sierra Nevada Mountains. The southernmost portion of Sacramento County has direct access to San Francisco Bay. Since 2010, statewide droughts in California have further strained Sacramento County's water security.

History
Sacramento County was one of the original counties of California, which were created in 1850 at the time of statehood. The county was named after the Sacramento River, which forms its western border. The river was named by Spanish cavalry officer Gabriel Moraga for the Santisimo Sacramento (Most Holy Sacrament), referring to the Catholic Eucharist.

Alexander Hamilton Willard, a member of the Lewis and Clark Expedition, is buried in the old Franklin Cemetery.

Geography

Most of the county is at an elevation close to sea level, with some areas below sea level. Major watercourses in the county include the American River, Sacramento River, Cosumnes River, a tributary of the Mokelumne River, and Dry Creek, a tributary of the Sacramento River.

Adjacent counties
 Sutter County - northwest
 Placer County - north
 El Dorado County - northeast
 Amador County - east
 San Joaquin County - south
 Contra Costa County - southwest
 Solano County - west
 Yolo County - west

National protected areas
 Stone Lakes National Wildlife Refuge
 California National Historic Trail
 Pony Express National Historic Trail

Demographics

2020 census

Note: the US Census treats Hispanic/Latino as an ethnic category. This table excludes Latinos from the racial categories and assigns them to a separate category. Hispanics/Latinos can be of any race.

2011

Places by population, ethnicity, and income

2010
The 2010 United States Census reported that Sacramento County had a population of 1,418,788. The racial makeup of Sacramento County was 815,151 (57.5%) White, 200,228 (15.4%) African American, 14,308 (1.0%) Native American, 203,211 (14.3%) Asian, 13,858 (1.0%) Pacific Islander, 131,691 (9.3%) from other races, and 93,511 (6.6%) from two or more races.  Hispanic or Latino of any race were 306,196 persons (21.6%).

2000
As of the census of 2000, there were 1,223,499 people, 453,602 households, and 297,562 families residing in the county. The racial makeup of the county was 64.0% White, 10.6% Black or African American, 1.09% Native American, 13.5% Asian, 0.6% Pacific Islander, 7.5% from other races, and 5.8% from two or more races. 19.3% of the population were Hispanic or Latino of any race. 10.2% were of German, 7.0% English, 6.7% Irish and 5.1% American ancestry according to Census 2000. 75.7% spoke only English at home; 10.0% spoke Spanish, 1.5% Hmong, 1.4% Chinese or Mandarin, 1.3% Vietnamese, 1.2% Tagalog and 1.2% Russian.

There were 453,602 households, out of which 33.7% had children under the age of 18 living with them, 46.4% were married couples living together, 14.1% had a female householder with no husband present, and 34.4% were non-families. 26.7% of all households were made up of individuals, and 8.0% had someone living alone who was 65 years of age or older. The average household size was 2.64 and the average family size was 3.24.

In the county, the population was spread out, with 27.6% under the age of 18, 9.5% from 18 to 24, 31.0% from 25 to 44, 20.9% from 45 to 64, and 11.1% who were 65 years of age or older. The median age was 34 years. For every 100 females, there were 95.9 males. For every 100 females age 18 and over, there were 92.5 males.

The median income for a household in the county was $43,816, and the median income for a family was $50,717. Males had a median income of $39,482 versus $31,569 for females. The per capita income for the county was $21,142. About 10.3% of families and 14.1% of the population were below the poverty line, including 20.2% of those under age 18 and 6.6% of those age 65 or over.

Government and policing

Government
The Government of Sacramento County is defined and authorized under the California Constitution, California law, and the Charter of the County of Sacramento. Much of the Government of California is in practice the responsibility of county governments such as the Government of Sacramento County, while municipalities such as the city of Sacramento and Folsom provide additional, often non-essential services.

It is composed of the elected five-member Board of Supervisors, several other elected offices including the Sheriff, District Attorney, and Assessor, and numerous county departments and entities under the supervision of the County Executive Officer. In addition, several entities of the government of California have jurisdiction conterminous with Sacramento County, such as the Sacramento County Superior Court.

Under its foundational Charter, the five-member elected Sacramento County Board of Supervisors (BOS) is the county legislature. The board operates in a legislative, executive, and quasi-judicial capacity. The current members are:

 Phil Serna, district 1
 Patrick Kennedy, district 2
 Rich Desmond, district 3
 Sue Frost, district 4
 Don Nottoli, district 5

The Sacramento County Code is the codified law of Sacramento County in the form of local ordinances passed by the Board of Supervisors.

Policing
The Sacramento County Sheriff provides court protection and jail management for the entire county. It provides patrol and detective services for the unincorporated areas of the county. Incorporated municipalities within the county that have their own municipal police departments or contract with the Sacramento County sheriff for their policing are: Elk Grove, 170,000, municipal department; Citrus Heights, 88,000, municipal department; Folsom, 78,000, municipal department; Isleton, sheriff contract; Rancho Cordova, 73,000, sheriff contract; Galt, population 26,000, municipal department.

Politics

Voter registration

Cities by population and voter registration

Overview
Sacramento County was politically competitive in most presidential elections between 1976 and 2004, but now votes significantly in favor of the Democratic candidates. Candidates from the Democratic Party have carried the county in the past eight presidential elections, and have won a majority of the county's votes four times during that time (in 2008, 2012, 2016, and 2020). The city of Sacramento is strongly Democratic, while rural areas are strongly Republican; suburban areas are more divided. This pattern is also present in congressional and state legislative elections. The last Republican presidential candidate to win a majority in the county was George H. W. Bush in 1988.

  
  
 

 

  
 

In gubernatorial elections, Sacramento County is typically a bellwether, having voted for the winner every time since 1962 with the exception of 1970 and 2002.  

In the House of Representatives, all of California's 6th congressional district and portions of its 3rd, and 7th districts are in the county.

In the State Assembly, all of the 7th and 8th districts and parts of the 6th, 9th, and 11th districts are in the county.

In the State Senate, parts of the 1st, 3rd, 4th, 6th, and 8th districts are in the county.

According to the California Secretary of State, as of October 22, 2012, Sacramento County has 698,899 registered voters, out of 944,243 eligible (74%). Of those, 306,960 (44%) are registered Democrats, 225,688 (32%) are registered Republicans, and 134,677 (19%) have declined to state a political party.

Crime 

The following table includes the number of incidents reported and the rate per 1,000 persons for each type of offense.

Cities by population and crime rates

Education

Colleges and universities

 Public universities 
California State University Sacramento
UC Davis Extension
UC Davis School of Medicine
UC Davis Betty Irene Moore School of Nursing

 Community colleges
Los Rios Community College District
American River College
Cosumnes River College
Folsom Lake College
Sacramento City College
Sierra College

 Private, not for profit
University of the Pacific in Sacramento
National University Sacramento Regional Campus
University of San Francisco Regional Campus
University of Southern California Extension
Western Seminary
Epic Bible College

 Private, for profit
Alliant International University
California Northstate University College of Pharmacy
Chamberlain University Rancho Cordova
DeVry University
Lincoln Law School of Sacramento
MTI College
Professional School of Psychology
San Joaquin Valley College
The Art Institute of California – Sacramento, a branch of The Art Institute of California - Los Angeles
Universal Technical Institute
University of Phoenix Sacramento Valley

K-12 education 
School districts include:

K-12:

 Center Joint Unified School District
 Elk Grove Unified School District
 Folsom-Cordova Unified School District
 Natomas Unified School District
 River Delta Joint Unified School District
 Sacramento City Unified School District
 San Juan Unified School District
 Twin Rivers Unified School District - Includes some areas for grades K-12, some for 7-12 only, and some for 9-12 only

Secondary:
 Galt Joint Union High School District
 Roseville Joint Union High School District

Elementary:

 Arcohe Union Elementary School District
 Dry Creek Joint Elementary School District
 Elverta Joint Elementary School District
 Galt Joint Union Elementary School District
 Robla Elementary School District

Transportation

Public Transportation
Sacramento Regional Transit District, also known as Sacramento RT, provides public transit throughout the county. It operates bus services, as well as light rail services on the Blue, Green, and Gold lines. In addition, the Yolobus provides Sacramento County with service connecting to destinations in neighboring Yolo County, such as Davis. Sacramento RT and Yolobus both provide bus services connecting Sacramento with Sacramento International Airport.

Amtrak and its Amtrak California subsidiary operate passenger rail service from the Sacramento Valley station. This station is served by the Coast Starlight, the California Zephyr, the Capitol Corridor, and the San Joaquins, which link the region with destinations across California and the United States.

Major highways

Airports
Sacramento International Airport is a major, full-service airport with passenger flights. It is owned by the County of Sacramento. The county also owns Sacramento Mather Airport in Rancho Cordova and Sacramento Executive Airport, both of which are general aviation airports. Sacramento McClellan Airport, formerly McClellan Air Force Base, is a privately owned airport between North Highlands and Rio Linda. There are also privately owned public use airports located in Elk Grove and Rio Linda.

Public roadways
The Sacramento County Department of Transportation (SACDOT) maintains approximately 2200 miles of roadway within the unincorporated area. The roads range from six lane thoroughfares to rural roads.

Communities

Cities
Citrus Heights
Elk Grove
Folsom
Galt
Isleton
Rancho Cordova
Sacramento (county seat)

Census-designated places

Antelope
Arden-Arcade
Carmichael
Clay
Courtland
Elverta
Fair Oaks
Florin
Foothill Farms
Franklin
Freeport
Fruitridge Pocket
Gold River
Herald
Hood
La Riviera
Lemon Hill
Mather
McClellan Park
North Highlands
Orangevale
Parkway
Rancho Murieta
Rio Linda
Rosemont
Vineyard
Walnut Grove
Wilton

Unincorporated community
Locke

Former townships

In February 1851, the county was divided into eight civil townships: the seven marked by asterisks below, plus Sacramento township. In July of that year, American township was divided off from Sacramento township. In 1856, the Board of Supervisors realigned the divisions into the 14 civil townships below, plus the city of Sacramento.

 Alabama
 American
 Brighton*
 Center*
 Cosumnes*
 Dry Creek
 Franklin
 Georgiana
 Granite
 Lee
 Mississippi*
 Natoma*
 San Joaquin*
 Sutter*

Population ranking

The population ranking of the following table is based on the 2020 census of Sacramento County.

† county seat

See also 

Hiking trails in Sacramento County
History of Sacramento, California
List of California Historical Landmarks in Sacramento County
List of school districts in Sacramento County, California
National Register of Historic Places listings in Sacramento County, California
Sacramento Metropolitan Cable Television Commission

Notes

References

External links

Sacramento County transit website
Sacramento Metro Chamber – representing Sacramento County and surrounding counties

 

 
California counties
Counties in the Sacramento metropolitan area
Sacramento Valley
1850 establishments in California
Populated places established in 1850
Majority-minority counties in California